The Francs-tireurs et partisans français (FTPF), or commonly the Francs-tireurs et partisans (FTP), was an armed resistance organization created by leaders of the French Communist Party during World War II (1939–45). The communist party was neutral at first, following the Soviet Union's official view that the war was a struggle between imperialists, but changed to a policy of armed resistance against the German occupation of France after Germany invaded the Soviet Union in June 1941. Three groups were formed, consisting of party members, young communists and foreign workers. Early in 1942 they were merged to form the FTP, which undertook sabotage and assassinations of the occupation. The FTP became the best organized and most effective of the French Resistance groups. In March 1944, before the Allied forces returned to Normandy, the FTP was theoretically merged with the other Resistance groups. In practice, it retained its independence until the end of the war.

Background

Germany attacked the Soviet Union on 22 June 1941 in Operation Barbarossa.
With this, the policy of the French Communist Party (Parti communiste français, PCF) policy switched to support for armed struggle against the German occupiers.
The National Front (Front national de l'indépendance de la France) was created as a French Resistance movement in the northern area in June 1941.
The Front national was theoretically independent of the PCF, but in reality it was dominated by the PCF.
At first the objectives were mainly political, taking advantage of the unstable situation under the occupying German army.
Charles Tillon was put in charge of military matters.

On 2 August 1941 Albert Ouzoulias was put in charge of the Bataillons de la Jeunesse, fighting groups that were being created by the Jeunesses Communistes. Soon after, Arthur Dallidet introduced him to Eugène Hénaff, who was responsible for the armed struggle under the direction of Tillon.
In October 1941 the PCF decided to unify its armed groups into the Organisation spéciale. Hénaff joined the leadership of the PCF's Organisation Spéciale, where he was responsible for coordinating between the various armed units. He was a member of the Comité militaire national, which became the Francs-tireurs et partisans français (FTPF).

Formation

Rather than limit armed action to Communists, it was decided to create a non-Communist organization, the Francs-Tireurs et Partisans (FTP), under the Front national.
The FTP was open to non-communists but operated under communist control.
The FTP movement was seen as a way to increase the political influence of the Communist Party in the future government of France.
A special issue of L'Humanité in February 1942 confirmed the existence of "partisans et de francs-tireurs" (partisans and free-shooters) to whom patriots should give aid and assistance. Another special issue in March 1942 urged people to form such groups to conduct guerrilla war and help the population defend itself against the "boches".

The FTP was created in April 1942, led by Charles Tillon.
On 3 April 1942 L'Humanité used the expression "Francs-Tireurs et Partisans" for the first time, and in following weeks reported acts of sabotage of war production and attacks against German soldiers and French collaborators. The paper began using the initials FTP in July 1942.
The FTP's mandate was to sabotage railways and factories, punish collaborators and assassinate German soldiers.

Organization

The FTP unified three Communist organizations, the Bataillons de la Jeunesse, the Organisation Spéciale and the Main-d'œuvre immigrée (MOI).
The FTP national committee was headed by Charles Tillon, commander in chief.
Albert Ouzoulias was in charge of operations, and Georges Beyer was responsible for armaments and recruitment.
, a captain of the reserve, was Chief of Staff.
He wrote some of the manuals on tactics and armament, but his main role was to act as liaison between the FTP and the Gaullist resistance groups.

The inter-regional and departmental military committees reported to the central organization in groups of three, a basic principle in the communist Resistance. 
In the field, each group would consist of two groups of three or four men under a commander and his assistant.
For as long as possible they would continue to work in their normal occupations, only coming together to undertake an operation and then if possible returning to their normal daily life.
Ouzoulias was a proponent of quick strikes against carefully studied targets by small groups of fighters, who would then rapidly withdraw. 
He also drew up guidelines for urban warfare in which FTP units could attack greatly superior German forces and be protected while they withdrew.
Tillon called this a strategy of "drops of mercury", through which the group could use surprise and mobility to achieve transient superiority before disappearing.

The FTP-MOI (Francs-tireurs et partisans – main-d'œuvre immigrée) was created in the spring of 1942 with four detachments made up of communists of "immigrant" origin.
Most of its fighters were Jews from France, Hungary, Romania or elsewhere in Europe. Some were former volunteers in the International Brigades of the Spanish Civil War (1936–39). 
Leaflets and publications were issued in Yiddish.
Although integrated with the FTP, the  FTP-MOI groups retained their autonomy, which caused problems at times.
The FTP-MOI were aroused to violent reprisals against the Germans by the Vel' d'Hiv Roundup in July 1942 in which Jews in Paris and other parts of France were arrested, detained and then deported to be killed in the Auschwitz concentration camp.
The violence of the FTP-MOI in their struggle for survival did not always coincide with the interests of the French people. 
They received little recognition in France after the war.

The FTP-MOI were the target of the notorious Affiche Rouge poster campaign, which emphasised the composition of the group's membership in an attempt to discredit the Resistance as not "French" enough. The campaign seems to have had the effect of highlighting their feats to the general public as freedom fighters.

History

The military strength of the communists was still relatively feeble at the end of 1941, but the rapid growth of the FTP ensured that French communists regained their reputation as an effective anti-fascist force.
Arthur Dallidet was placed in charge of security.
Dallidet was recognized talking to a woman in a cafe beside the Reuilly metro station on the evening on 28 February 1942. He was arrested, taken to La Santé Prison, chained, handcuffed and severely beaten. He did not reveal any information, but had been carrying a long list of names and addresses. This led to other arrests including "Betty" (Madeleine Passot), his most important liaison officer. Further names and addresses were found in Betty's apartment.

Gradually the FTP developed a more military organization, with sections, companies and battalions, each containing three lower-level groups. 
There were often gaps in this paper organization. The FTP complained that the British and Gaullists were deliberately depriving them of arms, although more likely the problem was that they did not have the necessary contacts to arrange delivery.

In November 1943 Joseph Epstein, the FTP Chief of Staff, was arrested and subjected to extreme torture, but revealed nothing. This was followed by a major police operation that largely destroyed the FTP's Paris organization. From the end of 1943 the national organization began to intensify preparation for a national uprising to support the expected Allied landings in Europe. 

By 1944, the FTP had an estimated strength of 100,000 men.
In March 1944 General Charles de Gaulle placed all the French Forces of the Interior (Forces françaises de l'intérieur, FFI). under the authority of General Marie-Pierre Kœnig, but the FTP retained its de facto independence.
During the Allied Normandy Campaign the FTP conducted delaying actions in the center and southwest of France against the German troops who had been recalled to the battle zone.

From June to August 1944 Ouzoulias coordinated the FTP's military action in the Paris region. Ouzoulias and Colonel Henri Rol-Tanguy, who led the Île-de-France Resistance movement, planned a major rising in Paris which played a vital role during the August 1944 Liberation of Paris.
On 28 August 1944 de Gaulle put Ouzoulias in charge of the FTP and the FFI.

In the autumn of 1944 Ouzoulias was charged by de Gaulle with integrating the FTP members with the regular French army.
In October 1944 the communist militias were dissolved and the FTP was integrated into General de Lattre's army.

See also
 Free France
 Lille during World War II
 Maquis (World War II)
 Military history of France during World War II
 Organisation de résistance de l'armée
 Resistance during World War II
 Zone libre

Notes

Sources

French Resistance networks and movements
History of the French Communist Party
Left-wing militant groups in France